The McConnell Center is an endowed institution created in 1991 by U.S. Senator Mitch McConnell, and the University of Louisville.

The McConnell Center's mission includes four major components: The McConnell Scholars Program, Public Lecture Series, Civic Education Program, and U.S. Senator Mitch McConnell and Secretary Elaine L. Chao Archives. The core of the McConnell Center is the McConnell Scholarship, offered each year to ten high school seniors from the Commonwealth of Kentucky.  These students, selected based upon their high school achievement, are offered tuition scholarships to the University of Louisville, as well as opportunities for travel, internships, meeting with influential policy makers and the opportunity to study abroad in China.

The scholars in the McConnell Center have met with President George W. Bush, United States Chief Justice John Roberts, Senator Edward Kennedy, Senator Harry Reid, Senator Richard Lugar, United States Secretary of State Condoleezza Rice, Secretary of Labor Elaine Chao (Senator McConnell's wife) and Lynne Cheney. The McConnell Center has also started a civics learning program to encourage classrooms in Kentucky to teach students history and the virtues of citizenship.

The Chair of the McConnell Center is Dr. Gary L. Gregg II and alumni include J. Scott Jennings.  The Center's non-resident fellows include Dr. Barbara A. Perry.

In November 2020, the wife of Judge Gregory F. Van Tatenhove, who had been a legislative aide of Senator Mitch McConnell, donated $250,000 to the McConnell Center.

Notes

External links
McConnell Center website

Political science organizations
University of Louisville
Educational institutions established in 1991
1991 establishments in Kentucky